Strawberry Hill railway station is in Strawberry Hill in the London Borough of Richmond upon Thames in south west London, and is in Travelcard Zone 5. The station, and all trains serving it, are operated by South Western Railway. The station is equipped with Oyster card swipe terminals.

The line through Strawberry Hill (the Kingston Loop) opened in 1863, but Strawberry Hill station did not open until 1 December 1873. The current booking office building on the up, or western, side and the platform canopies date from the 1935 modernisation. Lifting barriers replaced the level crossing swing gates in 1973, the signal box was demolished in 1975.

Strawberry Hill train maintenance depot, built in 1897, is inside the triangular junction of the Shepperton Branch Line with the Kingston Loop Line.

Service 
The off-peak weekday service in trains per hour at the station is:
 two to London Waterloo via Richmond
 two to London Waterloo via Wimbledon.

Monday to Friday, four additional early morning rush-hour trains to Waterloo are routed from Shepperton. Three additional evening rush-hour trains from Waterloo continue from here down the Shepperton Branch Line.

References

External links 
 Twickenham Museum article on Strawberry Hill Station

Railway stations in the London Borough of Richmond upon Thames
Former London and South Western Railway stations
Railway stations in Great Britain opened in 1873
Railway stations served by South Western Railway
Twickenham